[[|thumb|Radio Catskill logo]]

WJFF Radio Catskill (90.5 MHz) is a non-commercial, listener-supported public radio station licensed to Jeffersonville, New York and serving the Catskill Mountains of New York and Northeast Pennsylvania.  

WJFF has an effective radiated power (ERP) of 3,200 watts.  The transmitter is approximately two miles west of Liberty, New York, off Old Loomis Road.  Programming is also heard on FM translator W233AH at 94.5 MHz in Monticello.

History

In January 1988, Radio Catskill, Inc., received a construction permit for WJFF.  The radio station's studio building was built on the north side of the Jefferson Lake dam. Spearheaded by Malcolm Brown and the enthusiasm of local residents, the station was constructed almost entirely by volunteer labor.

The station signed on January 20, 1990.  Initially the station transmitted with a power of 830 watts.  This was increased to 3,700 watts in early 1996.

1996 was also the year that Catskill Radio Inc. applied for and received authorization to build its Monticello FM translator, 94.5 W233AH.

Initially, the offices and studios were powered by the hydroelectric energy being produced just down the driveway at the Lake Jefferson Dam. In 2005, veteran WJFF Radio Catskill volunteers, hydro operators, and dam crew members Kevin and Barbara Gref bought the dam and powerhouse from Malcolm Brown. Several severe floods have hit the Jeffersonville area since 2000 and in the flood of June 2006, which destroyed the Briscoe Lake dam, the spillway of the Lake Jefferson dam was damaged and Lake Jefferson was filled with silt, impacting the ability to provide hydro power to the station.

In July 2022, the station moved to new state of the art digital studios in Liberty, NY. The building and grounds were donated by listener Barbara Martinsons. 

The transmitter site is located on Elk Point Road in Liberty, NY, less than a mile from the new facilities.

Programming

The schedule is a mix of local, national and international programming, including several NPR shows (Morning Edition, All Things Considered and Fresh Air with Terry Gross) and the BBC World Service.

Translator
In addition to the main signal at 90.5 MHz, WJFF is relayed by a translator station to widen its broadcast area.

See also
List of community radio stations in the United States

References

External links

Historical articles about the station in the Spring 2005 station newsletter

JFF
Community radio stations in the United States
NPR member stations
Sullivan County, New York
Radio stations established in 1990
1990 establishments in New York (state)